The Cambridge Antiquarian Society is a society dedicated to study and preservation of the archaeology, history, and architecture of Cambridgeshire, England.

The society was founded in 1840. Its collections are housed in the Haddon Library on Downing Street in Cambridge, Cambridge University's Museum of Archaeology and Anthropology, and the Cambridgeshire Archives and Local Studies. Collections include archaeological publications, books, and periodicals, over 8,000 photographs, nearly 3,000 lantern slides, over 350 watercolours, and rubbings of monumental brasses.

See also
List of Antiquarian Societies

External links 
 Cambridge Antiquarian Society
 "Antiquarian Researches", The Gentleman's magazine, Volume 183, January 1848, pages 68–69.
 Archive.org: Cambridge Antiquarian Society List of publications, 1840-1915
 Current Archaeology entry
 19th Century British pamphlets online
 ARCHway Archaeology Data Service entry

Organisations based in Cambridge
History of Cambridgeshire
Non-profit organisations based in the United Kingdom
Organizations established in 1840
Historical societies of the United Kingdom
1840 establishments in England